NaissanceE is a first-person exploration and puzzle video game produced by French developer Limasse Five and released on Steam in 2014.

Gameplay

NaissanceE features only one character; Lucy. When sprinting, a circle will appear in the middle of the screen, prompting the player to control Lucy's breathing.

Plot

The only character is a girl called Lucy, who finds herself lost in a futuristic/sci-fi complex. The game begins with a cut-scene showing a creature chasing Lucy, who then falls down a trapdoor.

Reception

The game generally received very good reviews, being praised mainly for its atmosphere, soundtrack, and graphics. The level of difficulty of some of the challenges has been criticised though, with several reviewers believing that those challenges are too difficult. It has also been said that, due to the open nature of the setting, it can be easy to get lost.

Chris Capel of GameWatcher / Strategy Informer complained that "NaissanceE could've been a neat game but Limasse Five should've just stuck with making a cool artistic world and left the actual gameplay at home."

Jonathan Fortin of Hooked Gamers commended the game for its artistic vision but complained that "the developers didn't fully commit to that vision" and said that it could have nearly been a masterpiece if "the entire game had focused on the puzzles that made its first few hours such a delight" but concluded that "the game still comes recommended...but only for non-epileptic players who have a high tolerance for frustration."

Jim Rossignol of Rock Paper Shotgun said that "the oozing (yet markedly unpretentious) atmosphere, the sense of mystery, and the occasionally exquisite vistas provide enough of a reward to make it worth seeing, even if you will squirm at bloodying your patience, and grinding it against brutal jumping puzzles."

Petra Schmitz of GameStar gave the game 65 out of 100 and found parts of the game annoying while being fascinated with the abstract landscapes.

References

External links

2014 video games
Puzzle video games
Science fiction video games
Single-player video games
Unreal Engine games
Video games developed in France
Video games featuring female protagonists
Windows games
Windows-only games